Salvia kiaometiensis is a perennial plant that is native to Sichuan and Yunnan provinces in China, found growing on hillside grasslands at  elevation.

Inflorescences are compact 2–4 flowered verticillasters in terminal racemes.

Notes

kiaometiensis
Flora of China